Robert Wayne Wilson (February 18, 1934 – July 29, 2020) was a Canadian professional ice hockey defenceman who played in one National Hockey League game for the Chicago Black Hawks during the 1953–54 NHL season.

See also
List of players who played only one game in the NHL

References

External links

1934 births
2020 deaths
Baltimore Clippers players
Buffalo Bisons (AHL) players
Calgary Stampeders (WHL) players
Canadian expatriate ice hockey players in the United States
Canadian ice hockey defencemen
Chicago Blackhawks players
Galt Black Hawks players
Ice hockey people from Ontario
Los Angeles Blades (WHL) players
Sault Thunderbirds players
Sportspeople from Greater Sudbury
St. Louis Braves players